The rulers of the Duala are the headmen, chiefs, paramount chiefs, and kings of the Duala people of Cameroon. The earliest known Duala rulers, according to Duala oral history, were Mbongo and his son Mbedi. From Mbedi's home at Pīti, northeast of the modern city of Douala, his sons migrated southward. Ewale a Mbedi settled on the Wouri River at the Bight of Bonny (modern Douala) and became the eponymous founder of the Duala people.

Over time, the Duala split into various lineages. The earliest of these were the Priso sublineage, which established independence from the Bell lineage in the late 18th century. The Akwa lineage followed suit sometime in the early 19th century. Each of these families established a population centre along the banks of the Wouri. By the 19th century, Douala was thus divided into several of these residential areas, referred to as towns.

Beginning as early as the 18th century with Doo a Makongo, European traders began referring to the Duala rulers as chiefs and kings (kine in Duala). A dichotomy emerged under which the rulers of Akwa and Bell were kings, while the leaders of smaller lineages were chiefs or princes. These rulers were often given Europeanised names, such as King George or King Akwa. Beginning with the colonial era, German, French, and British colonial governments designated various Duala rulers as paramount chiefs. During this era, Duala rulers were often deposed and even exiled for any perceived infraction against the colonial government. Traditions of royalty have since ceased in some of these lineages, although in modern times, the royal line of some lineages has been reconstituted after an interregnum.

Early rulers

Bonanjo/Bonadoo/Bell lineage

Bonapriso/Joss sublineage

Bonaberi/Hickory sublineage

Bonambela/Akwa lineage
This list omits several rulers who served but briefly and who were succeeded by brothers rather than sons.

Bonebele/Deido sublineage

Notes

References
Austen, Ralph A., and Derrick, Jonathan (1999): Middlemen of the Cameroons Rivers: The Duala and their Hinterland, c. 1600–c.1960. Cambridge University Press.
Cameroon Traditional states. Worldstatesmen.org. Accessed 1 June 2006.

Duala, Rulers of the
Duala, Rulers of the
Rulers